The Campeonato Brasileiro Sub-20 is the official Brazilian national football tournament for U-20 teams. The Rio Grande do Sul Football Association (FGF) created the competition in 2006 and since 2015 it is organized by the Brazilian Football Confederation (CBF).

Participating teams
The first edition was played in the state of Rio Grande do Sul, contested by 30 clubs – the 20 clubs currently playing in the Campeonato Brasileiro plus 10 qualified from the federation's national ranking. Since 2007, only clubs participating in the same season's Série A are invited to participate in the Sub-20, unless one of the invited teams decide not to participate. In this case it is replaced by an invited team who is not competing in the Série A.

Format
In the first round, the 30 clubs were divided in six groups of five clubs each. The two best placed clubs of each group plus the four best third placed teams qualified to the second stage. The second stage onwards were contested in single knockout matches. The semifinals losers played a third place match, whereas the winners played the final.

Since 2007, the 20 participating teams are divided in four groups of five teams each. The two best placed teams of each group qualify to the quarterfinals. The quarterfinals onwards were contested in single knockout matches. The semifinals losers play a third place game in some editions of the competition, whereas the winners play the final.

Host cities
In 2014, the host cities were Porto Alegre, Gravataí, Novo Hamburgo and Alvorada. The final match occurred in the city of Porto Alegre.

List of champions

Organized by FGF - Copa RS

Organized by CBF

Titles

By team

By state

See also
 Campeonato Brasileiro

References

External links
RSSSF
Federação Gaúcha de Futebol

 
5
Youth football competitions in Brazil
5
Under-20 association football
Sports leagues established in 2006